Behlolpur is a town in Gujrat District in the Punjab province of Pakistan.

Geography 
Behlolpur is the name of a small village, within Gujrat District. Behlolpur is located 40 km from Gujrat city on Jalalpur- Head Marala road. It is located on the bank of river Chenab. This village is the second last village of district Gujrat on its border with Sialkot.

History 
The history of Behlolpur is ancient. This village was named after Behlol Lodhi, the Sultan of Delhi. The Mughal emperor Babar also stayed in this village during his march from Kabul to Delhi. Babar also mentioned his visit in his book Tuzuk-e-Babri. After the Partition of India and the creation of Pakistan, this village has become a major centre of trade and commerce.

Tourism 

From the village, one can get a very good view to Marala Headworks where the river Chenab majestically winds its way into Pakistan from Jammu and Kashmir. Marala Headworks on the river Chenab is a tourist spot and is located just about 2 km from Behlolpur. The Rivers Manawar Tawi, River Chenab and Jammu Tawi enter Pakistan from India and merge near the village, which gives a wonderful and lovely view. It is a very attractive tourist place with very fine picnic spots.

Demography 

The population is entirely Muslim.  The principal spoken language is Punjabi. The major tribes of the village are the Arain and Gujjar. Before partition major tribe of the village was Hindu Khatri , with mostly surnames Goindi and Trehan.

Climate 
Behlolpur has extreme climate in summer. During the peak of summer, the daytime temperature shoots up to 45 °C, but the hot spells are relatively short due to the proximity of the Azad Kashmir Mountains. During the winter, the minimum temperature may fall below 2 °C. The average rainfall is 67 cm.

Education 
The high school in the town, 'Government Boys High School Behlolpur', has nurtured many brilliant students over the years, few of them moved to cities for further education and some of them for employment. And there is also a school for girls "Government Girls Primary school".

See also 
Kurree Sharif
Rindheer Khokhran
Mari Khokhran
Tanda, Gujrat

References 

Populated places in Gujrat District